Mezhgorye is the name of several inhabited localities in Russia.

Urban localities
Mezhgorye, Republic of Bashkortostan, a closed town in the Republic of Bashkortostan

Rural localities
Mezhgorye, Primorsky Krai, a selo in Kirovsky District of Primorsky Krai